The 1952–53 Croatian-Slovenian League season was the first season of the Croatian-Slovenian League, the second level inter-republic association football competition of SFR Yugoslavia.

Teams
A total of ten teams contested the league, including six sides from the 1952 Croatian Republic League season and four clubs from the 1952 Slovenian Republic League season. The league was contested in a double round robin format, with each club playing every other club twice, for a total of 18 rounds. Two points were awarded for a win and one point for draws.

League table

See also
1952–53 Yugoslav First League
1952–53 Slovenian Republic League
1953 Yugoslav Cup

Yugoslav Second League seasons
Yugo
2